Viruvuru is a panchayat village in the Nellore district of Andhra Pradesh, India. It is situated on the exact bank of river Pennar (on the other bank one more village namely Sangam), 36 kilometres from Nellore.

References 

Villages in Nellore district